The men's 81 kg judo competition at the 2012 Summer Paralympics was held on 31 August at ExCeL London.

Results

Table A

Table B

Bronze Medal Contests A

Bronze Medal Contests B

References

External links
 

M81
Judo at the Summer Paralympics Men's Half Middleweight